The 2013 PSL Season was the maiden season of the Philippine Super Liga (PSL), the first professional volleyball league in the Philippines. The PSL began as a women's league during its inaugural tournament, the Invitational conference. A men's division was added for the succeeding tournament, the Grand Prix conference.

The TMS-Philippine Army Lady Troopers were the first PSL champions, winning both tournaments held during the season. For the men's division, the PLDT myDSL Speed Boosters emerged as the first champions.

Invitational Conference

The Invitational Conference, held from July 7, 2013 to July 28, 2013. It was the maiden tournament of the PSL.

Classification round (July 7, 2013 to July 17, 2013): 

|}

Playoffs (July 21, 2013 to July 28, 2013):

Final standing:

Awards

Grand Prix Conference

The Grand Prix Conference was held from November 10, 2013 to December 14, 2013.  For this conference (women's), each team was allowed to include two import players in the line up. A men's division was also introduced.

Women's division

Five teams from the Invitational conference continued in the Grand Prix conference. The PCSO Bingo Milyonaryo Puffins were replaced by the RC Cola Raiders.

Classification round (November 10, 2013 to December 1, 2013:

|}

Playoffs (December 4, 2013 to December 14, 2013):

Final standing:

Men's division

Classification round (November 10, 2013 to November 27, 2013):

|}

Playoffs (December 1, 2013 to December 14, 2013):

Final standing:

Awards

Venues

Invitational Conference:
PhilSports Arena
Filoil Flying V Arena
Mall of Asia Arena (semi-finals and finals)

Grand Prix Conference:
Filoil Flying V Arena
Ynares Sports Arena

Brand ambassador
 Richard Gomez

Broadcast partner
Solar Sports

References

Philippine Super Liga
PSL
PSL